Mariusz Klimczyk (born 16 September 1956 in Bydgoszcz) is a retired pole vaulter from Poland.

International competitions

1No mark in the final

References

1956 births
Living people
Polish male pole vaulters
Athletes (track and field) at the 1980 Summer Olympics
Olympic athletes of Poland
Sportspeople from Bydgoszcz
Zawisza Bydgoszcz athletes